Amsler is a surname. Notable people with the surname include:

Marc Amsler (1891–1968), Swiss ophthalmologist
Amsler grid
Amsler sign, a medical sign
Margaret Harris Amsler (1908–2002), American lawyer and academic
Marty Amsler (born 1942), American football player
Samuel Amsler (1791–1849), Swiss engraver

See also
Jakob Amsler-Laffon (1823–1912), Swiss mathematician, physicist and engineer
Amsler Island, an island of the Palmer Archipelago, Antarctica

German-language surnames